The 2014 Sioux City Bandits season was the team's fifteenth season as a professional indoor football franchise, fourteenth as the Sioux City Bandits and second as a member of Champions Professional Indoor Football League (CPIFL). One of nine teams in the CPIFL, the Bandits finished the regular season 9-3 to earn the number two seed in the playoffs, in which they beat the Salina Bombers, 66-37 in the semifinals, but lost the CPIFL Champions Bowl II, 46-41 to the Wichita Wild.

Schedule
Key:

Pre-season

Regular season

Post-season

References

2014 in sports in Iowa
Sioux City Bandits
Sioux City Bandits